Luquembo  is a town and municipality in Malanje Province in Angola. The municipality had a population of 54,880 in 2014.

References

Populated places in Malanje Province
Municipalities of Angola